Qeshlaq-e Mohammadi (also Romanized as Qeshlāq-e Moḩammadī; also known as Gheshlagh) is a village in Kamazan-e Sofla Rural District, Zand District, Malayer County, Hamadan Province, Iran. At the 2006 census, its population was 75, in 13 families.

References 

Populated places in Malayer County